Rani Sati Mandir is located at Mahuda area in Dhanbad District, Jharkhand, India. It is a famous temple in this area.

References

Hindu temples in Jharkhand